Shepherd's Close is a  nature reserve south of Spaldwick in Cambridgeshire. It is managed by the Wildlife Trust for Bedfordshire, Cambridgeshire and Northamptonshire.

This small wood was planted in 1984 with ash, field maple and oak. Birds include blackcaps and chiffchaffs, and there are peacock, orange-tip and speckled wood butterflies.

There is access from Stonely Road.

References

Wildlife Trust for Bedfordshire, Cambridgeshire and Northamptonshire reserves